Northiam SSSI is a  geological Site of Special Scientific Interest in Northiam in East Sussex. It is a Geological Conservation Review site.

This partly flooded former quarry is the type locality for the Northiam Sandstone Member of the Wadhurst Clay Formation, part of the Wealden Group which dates to the Early Cretaceous. It is important for the study of the paleogeography and paleoenvironments of the Wadhurst Clay Formation.

The site is private land with no public access.

References

Sites of Special Scientific Interest in East Sussex
Geological Conservation Review sites
SSSI